Lee Jin-kyung (born January 7, 1994), professionally known as Lee Sun-bin, is a South Korean actress and singer. She is known for starring in Squad 38 (2016), Missing 9 (2017), and Criminal Minds (2017). She is a former member of South Korean girl group JQT.

Career

2011–2015: Beginnings, modelling and overseas activities 

In October 2011, GP Entertainment revealed that Lee would be joining their new girl group JQT, under her birth name Jin-kyung, upon departure of one of the members, Minsun. Lee participated in JQT's activities as a vocalist until their disbandment in February 2012. She took on a modelling gig alongside Teen Top for uniforms in November 2012, and was said to be debuting again in another girl group in December 2012, but plans did not follow through. She then left GP Entertainment and joined Wellmade Yedang as an acting trainee. Before officially beginning her acting career, Lee was a CF model and made several music video appearances.

In 2014, Lee received her first acting role in the Chinese historical drama Saint Wang Xizhi. Lee also participated as a contestant in CCTV's singing show Finding Liu San Jie, and the New Year Gala.

2016–present: Rising popularity 
In January 2016, Lee took on a supporting role in the JTBC drama Madame Antoine: The Love Therapist, followed by several cameo appearances in dramas and films. Her breakthrough role came in June 2016, where she portrayed a gold digger in OCN's hit drama Squad 38 alongside Seo In-guk and Ma Dong-seok. She went on to participate in several variety shows where she received praise for her singing and dancing.

In January 2017, Lee co-starred in MBC's disaster drama Missing 9. In July, she starred in tvN's remake of the American blockbuster television series Criminal Minds, where she played the Korean version of JJ's character. In September, she began filming for Kim Sung-hoon's action zombie film Rampant alongside Jang Dong-gun and Hyun Bin.

In 2018, Lee was cast in her first leading role in JTBC's action drama Sketch. The same year she was cast in tvN's drama special The Dramatization Has Already Begun.

In 2019, Lee was cast in action comedy film Okay! Madam and political drama The Great Show.

In 2020, Lee was cast in the crime detective drama Team Bulldog: Off-Duty Investigation.

In 2021, she starred in action spy film Mission: Possible opposite Kim Young-kwang. In August 2021, Lee signed with Initial Entertainment, after the contract with the original agency expired.

In 2022, Lee made a comeback with the Film Air Murder, a return to the big screen.

Personal life
On December 31, 2018, it was reported that Lee had been dating actor Lee Kwang-soo, with King Kong by Starship stating that the couple had been dating "for 5 months" prior to the announcement of their relationship.

Discography

Singles

Soundtrack appearances

Filmography

Film

Television series

Web series

Television shows

Web shows

Music video appearances

Ambassadorship 
 2021 Gyeonggi World Ceramic Biennale (2021)
 Cheonan Public Relations Ambassador (2022)

Awards and nominations

References

External links

 Official website
 
 
 

1994 births
Living people
People from Cheonan
South Korean female idols
South Korean television actresses
South Korean film actresses
South Korean web series actresses
21st-century South Korean actresses
21st-century South Korean singers
21st-century South Korean women singers